Goujulong (Chinese: 枸桔弄) is a metro station on Line 6 of the Hangzhou Metro in China. It is the east terminus of Line 6 and located in the Shangcheng District. It opened on November 6, 2021.

References 

Hangzhou Metro stations
Railway stations in China opened in 2021
Railway stations in Zhejiang